Songs of Surrender is an album of re-recorded songs by Irish rock band U2. Produced by guitarist the Edge, it was released on 17 March 2023 on Island Records and Interscope Records. Largely the effort of the Edge and lead vocalist Bono, the album comprises re-recorded and reinterpreted versions of 40 songs from the group's back catalogue, many in stripped-down and acoustic arrangements. The album is a companion to Bono's memoir, Surrender: 40 Songs, One Story (2022), which was structured into 40 chapters titled after U2 songs. Rearranged versions of the songs were first included in the audiobook edition of the memoir, and were performed by Bono during the book's promotional tour.

Recording on Songs of Surrender began in 2021 and spanned a two-year period during lockdowns for the COVID-19 pandemic. The Edge and Bono worked on the album informally at the Edge's home and in France, as well as at recording studios in London and Los Angeles. During the sessions, the band members collaborated with numerous producers and musicians, including Bob Ezrin, Duncan Stewart, Declan Gaffney, and Stjepan Hauser.

Recording

Songs of Surrender comprises re-recorded and reinterpreted versions of 40 songs from U2's back catalogue. Recorded over a two-year period during lockdowns for the COVID-19 pandemic, the album was largely the effort of guitarist the Edge and lead vocalist Bono, with the Edge also serving as the record's curator and producer. The idea to re-record U2 songs had been circulating within the band for a while, as the Edge wanted "to see if [their] songs could be reimagined in a more intimate style, as if Bono was singing in your ear". Ultimately, the confluence of two events convinced the Edge to pursue a re-recording project: the pandemic lockdowns resulted in more free time that he viewed as a creative opportunity; and Bono decided to structure his memoir Surrender: 40 Songs, One Story into 40 chapters titled after U2 songs. Songs of Surrender was conceived as a way to mirror the book's chapters. Since U2's record label was not expecting a new album, the band agreed that they would only release the project if they were satisfied with the results.

Work on Songs of Surrender began in earnest in early 2021. For the re-recordings, the band members decided that they did not need to remain faithful to the original versions of the songs; the Edge said, "We gave ourselves permission to disregard any sense of reverence for the originals." The Edge began by composing musical ideas on acoustic guitar and piano, and by improvising vocal ideas that he would later play for Bono, with whom he shares a similar vocal range. The duo were encouraged by the results of their first session, during which Bono sang over the Edge's musical ideas. In subsequent sessions, they worked casually using a makeshift recording room in the Edge's house. While experimenting with new arrangements for the songs, the Edge changed their keys, chords, and rhythms, while Bono often rewrote the lyrics. The Edge and Bono occasionally collaborated when they were both in France at the same time. On one such occasion, they worked with producer Declan Gaffney and cellist Stjepan Hauser for four to five days. The sessions produced versions of "Vertigo" and "Dirty Day" that were based around the cello. The group also collaborated with engineer Duncan Stewart.

In addition to working sporadically with each other for a few days at a time in informal settings, the Edge and Bono held formal recording sessions in London and Los Angeles. In the London session, which was intended to "really get the ball rolling", producer Brian Eno recorded vocals and U2 bassist Adam Clayton laid down bass tracks. Clayton recorded his parts not knowing if they would be used on the final mixes, and he approached them with the mindset of "how those Simon & Garfunkel records were made... essentially acoustic guitar tracks that there were some rhythmic elements added to." In Los Angeles, the Edge and Bono worked with producer Bob Ezrin, as well as musicians Daniel Lanois and Abe Laboriel Jr., both of whom provided backing vocals. Ezrin reviewed the band's demo recordings to help them determine which song arrangements worked and which ones needed refinement. The Edge said that the sessions in Los Angeles "fleshed out the arrangement" of the songs and "helped [them] get the project over the line". 

Drummer Larry Mullen Jr. contributed percussion on the album but according to the Edge, "didn't want to, or wasn't ready to" play a full drum kit at the time of the recording sessions. As a result, the Edge consulted drum loops that Mullen had previously recorded; one of them was the origin of the new version of "Get Out of Your Own Way".

Over the course of recording Songs of Surrender, the Edge estimated that the group created 50 new song arrangements in total.

Release and promotion

Pre-announcement updates
Clayton first mentioned a re-recording project during a June 2021 interview with Rocky O'Riordan on the band's U2-X Radio station on Sirius XM: "we are playing around with rearranging some of the songs that we have and setting them in a more acoustic environment. Edge got a bit of a bee in his bonnet and... said let's look at these songs and imagine them in a different context. So we are playing around with that. He's putting a lot of work into changing the keys, and moving them onto piano and that sort of thing." Clayton added that he hoped for a release by the end of 2021.

Following the release of Surrender: 40 Songs, One Story in November 2022, new arrangements of U2 songs began to materialise publicly. For the audiobook edition of the memoir, each chapter was briefly introduced with a re-recording of the song for which it was named, and during the "Stories of Surrender" promotional tour for the book, Bono performed many songs in stripped-down arrangements with the aid of musicians Kate Ellis (cello, keyboards, vocals), Gemma Doherty (harp, keyboards, vocals), and U2 producer Jacknife Lee ("musical director" – keyboards, percussion).

Before Songs of Surrender was officially announced, Bono mentioned the album by name in a section of his memoir titled "After the After Words". After acknowledging he had rewritten some of his lyrics in the book, he wrote: "During lockdown we were able to reimagine forty U2 tracks for the Songs of Surrender collection, which gave me a chance to live inside those songs again as I wrote this memoir. It also meant I could deal with something that's been nagging me for some time. The lyrics on a few songs that I've always felt were never quite written. They are now. (I think.)" In late November 2022, in a Washington Post article profiling the band prior to their receiving Kennedy Center Honors, writer Geoff Edgers said that the group had recorded "40 stripped-down versions of the songs featured in the memoir" and that the collection was targeted for release in early 2023.

Announcement and marketing
In January 2023, select U2 fans worldwide received photocopies of a handwritten letter by the Edge via postal mail in which he teased the project. The top of the letter bore a short sequence of Morse code that spelled out the album title. Around the same time, 40 of the group's songs were updated on Spotify with an embedded video snippet that depicted the same Morse code, leading fans to piece together what they believed to be the track listing. 

Songs of Surrender was officially announced on 10 January 2023 with a trailer video soundtracked by a new version of "Beautiful Day"; the video also revealed the album's release date of 17 March. The day after the project was announced, the track listings and release formats were confirmed. Although it was speculated that the record's 40 tracks would match the book's 40 chapter names, the two do not completely align with one another; ultimately, 28 songs match across both projects. All studio albums from the group's career are represented with the exception of: October (1981); No Line on the Horizon (2009); and Original Soundtracks 1 (1995), U2's collaboration with Eno that was released under the pseudonym "Passengers".

The announcement of the track listings was accompanied by the release of a new version of "Pride (In the Name of Love)", which was premiered by radio host Dave Fanning on RTÉ 2fm. A second song, "With or Without You", was released on 27 January, and a third song, "One", soundtracked the National Football League's presentation of the Walter Payton NFL Man of the Year Award prior to Super Bowl LVII on 12 February. A fourth song, "Beautiful Day", was released on 3 March.

The album was released in the following formats:
 Digital download – full track listing of 40 songs
 Super Deluxe Hardback Collector's edition (4 CDs, or 4 vinyl LPs) – full track listing of 40 songs
 Deluxe edition (CD) – 20 songs
 Standard edition (CD, 2 vinyl LPs, or cassette tape) – 16 songs

Many limited-edition coloured variants of the double-vinyl LP were produced, including: a blue-and-gold one themed after the University of Notre Dame; a green-and-white one themed after the Boston Celtics basketball team; and a blue one available only to SiriusXM radio subscribers.

On 21 February 2023, the group announced that they had commissioned 40 artists to create 60-second videos to accompany each of the album's tracks, and that they would be progressively released through a YouTube playlist. The week of the album release, the band announced a "40 songs, 40 cities" promotion, whereby fans could gather at a location in 40 cities worldwide to find a lyrical tribute to the album's songs, as well as access exclusive merchandise and a bespoke photo filter.

To coincide with the album's 17 March release date, a television special entitled Bono & The Edge: A Sort of Homecoming, With Dave Letterman was released on Disney+. The programme, directed by Morgan Neville, features documentary footage of Bono and the Edge touring their native Dublin with comedian David Letterman, as well as a concert performance at Ambassador Theatre.

Several radio programmes aired in promotion of the album. On 17 March, iHeartRadio broadcast "iHeartRadio ICONS with The Edge: Celebrating U2's Songs of Surrender", for which the Edge was interviewed by host Jim Kerr. On the band's U2 X-Radio station of Sirius XM, two specials were broadcast starting the day of the album's release: "Songs of Surrender: A Conversation with Bono and Edge", featuring a discussion with the two band members; and "Songs of Surrender Track-by-Track Hosted by U2", which played the entire the album. Bono and the Edge also performed for BBC Radio 2's Piano Room and NPR Music's Tiny Desk Concert series.

Reception

Tom Doyle of Mojo said that for U2, the album "sounds like a kind of liberation. If their creative missteps in the past two decades have generally been caused by their twin determinations to keep up with modern pop and relentlessly pursue music that works in stadia, then here they've cut themselves free from all of that." Joe Gross of Rolling Stone said that the stripped-down song arrangements redeemed the Edge from any accusations of being over-reliant on guitar effects, and that his work on the album "reminds you these are sturdy songs that can be rethought without any sonic window dressing". John Walshe of Hot Press said the re-recordings mostly "work beautifully and occasionally surprisingly" and that: "Stripping these songs back to their core gives both band and listener a chance to re-connect with them, to hear them with fresh ears. For the most part, that also serves to remind us just how bloody magnificent they were in the first place." Neil McCormick of The Daily Telegraph said that "altered perspectives" such as the one from "Dirty Day" helped "make this measured, inventive, introspective collection so compelling, as U2 turn their own songs inside out in search of new nuances and meanings". Will Hodgkinson of The Times was struck by a "sense of the reworked music reflecting the inevitable ravages of age, and the greater degree of reflection that brings". He said that "modesty — a word I never thought I would write in relation to U2 — is exactly what makes Songs of Surrender a gentle, rather moving reinvention".

John Garratt of PopMatters questioned the necessity of a quadruple album with minimal alterations to the songs and lamented the band's shift from previously surprising listeners to being predictable. He criticised the group for having the songs "repeat the same mistake made 21 years prior when The Best of 1990–2000 was regrettably peppered with 'new' mixes – they just aren't that interesting." Alexis Petridis of The Guardian said, "The record's conceptual shakiness is less of an issue than its unwieldiness"; he said that when listening to it all at once, "it struggles to hold your attention", but that "Taken in smaller doses, there are great moments marked by a sense of genuine reinvention". Petridis enjoyed the reimagined deep cuts the most and thought the group's biggest songs "don't work rendered in soft-focus miniature". Helen Brown of The Independent called Songs of Surrender "an album of shadow versions that leave you yearning for originals", and she posited that an album of intimate, sombre songs might have resonated more had it been released during the pandemic "when time bent to make sense of such lengthy releases. But it's 2023 now, and we need the wide-horizon howl and electric ambition of U2's classic sound, not this sleepy faux-hipster slog."

Track listing

Full digital and super deluxe physical versions

Standard and deluxe physical versions

 On digital releases, all tracks are suffixed with "Songs of Surrender" to differentiate them from the original recordings.

Personnel
Adapted from the liner notes. Track numbers correspond to the album's full 40-song track listing.
U2
Bono – vocals
The Edge – guitar, vocals, piano, keyboards, bass , bass guitar , Rhodes , bass programming , dulcimer , Wurlitzer electric piano , drum programming , ukulele 
Adam Clayton – bass guitar
Larry Mullen Jr. – drums and percussion, piano 

Additional performers
Abe Laboriel Jr.  – backing vocals and vocal arrangement 
Bob Ezrin – synthesiser , cello , organ , acoustic guitar , sound effects , strings and string arrangement 
Duncan Stewart – guitar , percussion , keyboards , backing vocals , Rhodes , synthesiser , additional keyboards , programming , organ , Wurlitzer electric piano , marimba , drum programming and synthesiser programming , acoustic guitar , flute , hand claps 
Declan Gaffney – piano , synthesiser 
Hauser – cello 
Terry Lawless – additional keyboards 
Anil Sebastian – choir 
Anna Holloway – choir 
Caitlin Sinclair – choir 
Cerian Holland – choir 
Connor Going – choir 
Didier Rochard – choir 
Jeremy Franklin – choir 
Kate Westall – choir 
Liv Barath – choir 
Lydia Clowes – choir 
Chloe Dale Poswilo – backing vocals 
Hollis Howard – backing vocals 
Peter Gregson – cello 
John Metcalfe – brass band and horn arrangement , strings and string arrangement 
Karsh Kale – bells , choir arrangement , orchestra 
Hillspring Children's Choir (Mumbai) – choir 
Kamakshi Khanna – choir 
Ezra Mullen – tambourine 
Dan Oestreicher – alto saxophone and baritone saxophone 
Rori Coleman – brass band 
Trombone Shorty – brass band 
Yirmayah Yisrael – tenor saxophone 
Andres Forero – percussion 
Brian Eno – backing vocals 
Daniel Lanois – backing vocals 
Stuart Morgan – Fender bass 
Andy Barlow – additional keyboards 
Jolyon Thomas – guitar and additional keyboards 

Technical
The Edge – production, engineering 
Bob Ezrin – production , co-production , mixing 
Duncan Stewart – production , additional production , engineering , mixing 
Declan Gaffney – production , additional production , engineering , mixing 
Richard Rainey – additional production , engineering , mixing 
Bono – production 
Alastair McMillan – engineering , mixing 
Julian Shank – additional engineering 
Bobby Mota – additional engineering 
Jonathan Pfarr – engineering , additional engineering 
Alisse Laymac – engineering 
Nicole Schmidt – additional engineering 
Toby Alington – engineering 
Rab McAllister – additional engineering 
Paul Schoen – engineering 
Rob Kinelski – mixing 
Eli Heisler – mixing assistance 
Scott Sedillo – mastering engineering

References

External links
 Songs of Surrender at U2.com

2023 albums
Albums produced by the Edge
Interscope Records albums
Island Records albums
U2 albums